Aegialus or Aigialos was a coastal town in ancient Paphlagonia, mentioned by Homer in the Iliad as an ally of Troy during the Trojan War.

Its site is located near Karaağaç Limanı, Asiatic Turkey.

References

Populated places in ancient Paphlagonia
Former populated places in Turkey
Locations in the Iliad
History of Kastamonu Province